Laurence Bennett is an American production designer. He was nominated for an Academy Award in the category Best Production Design for the film The Artist.

Selected filmography 
 The Artist (2011; co-nominated with Robert Gould)

References

External links 
 

Living people
Place of birth missing (living people)
Year of birth missing (living people)
American production designers